Hanguana  is a genus of flowering plants with a dozen known species. It is the only genus in the family Hanguanaceae.

The APG IV system of 2016 recognizes such a family and places it in the order Commelinales, in the clade commelinids, in the monocots (unchanged from the APG III system of 2009 and the APG II system of 2003. This represents a slight change from the APG system, of 1998, which left Hanguanaceae unplaced as to order, but assigned it to these same clades (although it used the name commelinoids). The family consists of only very few species of perennial, tropical plants in Sri Lanka, Southeast Asia, New Guinea, Micronesia, and northern Australia.

Species currently accepted (August 2014):
Hanguana bakoensis Siti Nurfazilah, Sofiman Othman & P.C.Boyce - Sarawak
Hanguana bogneri Tillich & E.Sill - Sarawak
Hanguana exultans Siti Nurfazilah, Mohd Fahmi, Sofiman Othman & P.C.Boyce - Peninsular Malaysia
Hanguana kassintu Blume - Java
Hanguana loi Mohd Fahmi, Sofiman Othman & P.C.Boyce - Sarawak
Hanguana major Airy Shaw - Sarawak, Sabah
Hanguana malayana (Jack) Merr. - Sri Lanka, Myanmar, Thailand, Vietnam, Peninsular Malaysia, Borneo, Java, Sumatra, Sulawesi, Philippines, New Guinea, Queensland, Northern Territory, Palau
Hanguana neglecta ? - Malaya
Hanguana nitens Siti Nurfazilah, Mohd Fahmi, Sofiman Othman & P.C.Boyce - Peninsular Malaysia
Hanguana pantiensis Siti Nurfazilah, Mohd Fahmi, Sofiman Othman & P.C.Boyce - Peninsular Malaysia
Hanguana podzolica Siti Nurfazilah, Mohd Fahmi, Sofiman Othman & P.C.Boyce - Peninsular Malaysia
Hanguana stenopoda Siti Nurfazilah, Mohd Fahmi, Sofiman Othman & P.C.Boyce - Peninsular Malaysia

References

External links
Monocot families (USDA)
links at CSDL

Commelinales
Commelinales genera